Sweden competed at the 2012 European Athletics Championships in Helsinki, Finland, from 27 June to 1 July 2012.

Medals

Results

Men

Track

Field

Combined events

Women

Track

Field

Combined events

Sources
 Swedish Athletic Association

Nations at the 2012 European Athletics Championships
Sweden at the European Athletics Championships
European Athletics Championships